The 2017 Atlanta Falcons season was the franchise's 52nd season in the National Football League and their third under head coach Dan Quinn. They entered the season as the defending NFC champions and tried to defend their NFC title for a second consecutive trip to the Super Bowl after losing the previous year against the Patriots in Super Bowl LI after blowing a 28-3 lead. This was the Falcons' first year in Mercedes-Benz Stadium after spending the previous 25 seasons in the Georgia Dome, which was demolished on November 20, 2017. Mercedes-Benz Stadium opened as scheduled on August 26, 2017; however, its retractable roof system was incomplete. The roof of Mercedes-Benz Stadium remained in the closed position for most of the 2017 season, with the roof opened only during the September 17 game against the Green Bay Packers, as contractors continued to fully mechanize the roof.

On December 13, 2017, Tommy Nobis, the first player drafted by the Falcons, died at the age of 74.

Despite the Falcons failing to improve on their 11–5 record from 2016 or defend their NFC South title, the team posted its first consecutive winning seasons, consecutive 10-win seasons, and consecutive playoff berths since the 2012 season. The Falcons were the only NFC team from the 2016 playoffs to qualify for the 2017 playoffs. In the playoffs, the Falcons defeated the Los Angeles Rams in the Wild Card Round, but lost against the eventual Super Bowl champion Philadelphia Eagles in the NFC Divisional round.

As of 2022, this represents the most recent winning season and playoff appearance for the Falcons.

Offseason

Signings

Draft

Undrafted free agents

Staff

Final roster

Preseason

Regular season

Schedule

Note: Intra-division opponents are in bold text.

Game summaries

Week 1: at Chicago Bears

Week 2: vs. Green Bay Packers

In their home opener, the Falcons hosted the Green Bay Packers in a rematch of the 2016 NFC Championship Game. This was the first regular season game at Mercedes-Benz Stadium. Despite prior reports that the roof would be closed for the game, Falcons owner Arthur Blank elected to open the roof if weather permitted, marking the first time since the 1991 season, the team's final season at their original home of Atlanta–Fulton County Stadium, that the Falcons played a home game in Atlanta under open air. The Falcons controlled most of the game, went up by as much as 24, and won 34–23. They were led by Devonta Freeman (19 rushes, 84 yards, 2 TD) and Julio Jones (108 yards, 5 receptions). The 2017 Falcons became only the fourth team in NFL history to start 2–0 after they lost the Super Bowl the previous year.

Week 3: at Detroit Lions

Week 4: vs. Buffalo Bills

Week 6: vs. Miami Dolphins

Week 7: at New England Patriots

In a rematch of Super Bowl LI the Falcons were trying to revenge their loss in Super Bowl LI, where they blew a 28-3 lead and lost in overtime instead the Falcons loss the Super Bowl rematch 23-7.

Week 8: at New York Jets

Week 9: at Carolina Panthers

Week 10: vs. Dallas Cowboys

In the Falcons' victory, Adrian Clayborn set a new franchise record of six sacks in one game, breaking the previous record of five sacks.

Week 11: at Seattle Seahawks

Week 12: vs. Tampa Bay Buccaneers

Week 13: vs. Minnesota Vikings

Week 14: vs. New Orleans Saints

Week 15: at Tampa Bay Buccaneers

The win eliminated Green Bay from postseason contention.

Week 16: at New Orleans Saints

Week 17: vs. Carolina Panthers

Standings

Division

Conference

Postseason

NFC Wild Card Playoffs: at (3) Los Angeles Rams

NFC Divisional Playoffs: at (1) Philadelphia Eagles

References

External links
 

Atlanta
Atlanta Falcons seasons
Atlanta Falcons